Petar Đurin (born 4 March 2001) is a Croatian footballer who plays as a goalkeeper.

Club career
In 2018, Đurin signed for English third division side Portsmouth from the youth academy of Atalanta in the Italian Serie A, where he said, "in Croatia, a lot is being done on explosiveness and strength. Shots are quite important, and lately it is sought after and played with the foot. In Italy a lot of attention is paid to technique and setup, and in England work is done on center shots that are sharper than anywhere I’ve been."

In 2019, he was sent on loan to English seventh division club Bognor Regis Town. In 2021, Đurin signed for Apollon (Limassol) in the Cypriot top flight from Croatian third division team Mladost Petrinja. On 23 August 2021, he debuted for Apollon (Limassol) during a 4-2 win over Ethnikos (Achna).

References

External links
 
 Petar Đurin at playmakerstats.com

2001 births
Living people
Footballers from Zagreb
Association football goalkeepers
Croatian footballers
Portsmouth F.C. players
Bognor Regis Town F.C. players
Apollon Limassol FC players
Cypriot First Division players
Croatian expatriate footballers
Expatriate footballers in Italy
Croatian expatriate sportspeople in Italy
Expatriate footballers in England
Croatian expatriate sportspeople in England
Expatriate footballers in Cyprus
Croatian expatriate sportspeople in Cyprus